Micrixalus sali, commonly known as Sali's Dancing Frog, is a species of frogs in the family Micrixalidae.
It is endemic to the Western Ghats, India. The preferred habitats of M. sali are damp leaf litter, exposed streambeds, and brooks in moist evergreen forests. 

The species is named after famous wild life photographer Sali Palode, who documented the pygmy elephant Kallana in Kerala, India, as a token of appreciation for his support of field studies in the Western Ghats area.

References

Micrixalus
Endemic fauna of the Western Ghats
Frogs of India
Amphibians described in 2014
Taxa named by Sathyabhama Das Biju